Qaan Dhoole is a town in the southeastern Lower Shabelle (Shabeellaha Hoose) region of Somalia.

References
Qaan Dhoole

Populated places in Lower Shebelle